The short-toed coucal (Centropus rectunguis) is a species of cuckoo in the family Cuculidae.
It is found in Brunei, Indonesia, Malaysia, and Thailand.
Its natural habitats are subtropical or tropical moist lowland forest and subtropical or tropical moist shrubland.
It is threatened by habitat loss.

References

External links
BirdLife Species Factsheet.

short-toed coucal
Birds of Malesia
short-toed coucal
Taxonomy articles created by Polbot